Rutger Castricum (born in The Hague on 29 May 1979) is a Dutch journalist and presenter, who was known as reporter for the PowNews television programme by the Dutch broadcaster PowNed and previously for the blog Geenstijl. On April 26, 2007, Castricum was arrested with Melssen while filming under women's skirts in a parking garage for GeenStijl, eventually dismissing the case.

References

External links 
 

1979 births
Living people
Dutch reporters and correspondents
Dutch television presenters
Dutch television talk show hosts
Dutch television news presenters
Journalists from The Hague
Dutch opinion journalists